The road speed skating competition at the 2022 World Games took place on July 10 and 11 2022, in Birmingham, Alabama, United States, at the Powell Steam Plant.
Originally scheduled to take place in July 2021, the Games were rescheduled for July 2022 as a result of the 2020 Summer Olympics postponement due to the COVID-19 pandemic.

Medal table

Events

Men

Women

References

External links
 The World Games 2022
 WorldSkate
 Results book

 
2022 World Games